Jamie Parker (born 14 August 1979) is an English actor and singer. He is best known for his role as Harry Potter in the original cast for the West End play Harry Potter and the Cursed Child, for which he received a Laurence Olivier Award for Best Actor in a Leading Role in a Play and a WhatsOnStage Award for Best Actor in a Play. He also received a nomination for a Tony Award for Best Actor in a Leading Role in a Play as a member of the original Broadway version.

Other theatre credits include King Henry in the 2012 Globe production of Shakespeare's Henry V, with notable film roles being Donald Scripps in The History Boys (2006), adapted by Alan Bennett from his play of the same name in which Parker was a member of the original cast, and Lieutenant Werner von Haeften in Valkyrie (2008).

Early life
Parker was born in Middlesbrough, Cleveland, on 14 August 1979 and brought up in Darlington. He attended Loretto School before training in acting at the Royal Academy of Dramatic Art (RADA), from which he graduated in 2002.

Career
Parker originated the role of Scripps in Alan Bennett's play The History Boys. He was involved in The History Boys from the play's first reading, initially reading the part of Rudge before taking on the role of Scripps in the original London stage production as well as in the Broadway, Sydney, Wellington and Hong Kong productions and radio and film versions of the play. Parker put his musical talents to use in The History Boys, playing piano and singing in several scenes.  His other National Theatre credits include a 2008 revival of The Revenger's Tragedy.

In 2008 he appeared as Werner von Haeften in the film of the historical thriller Valkyrie. He can also be seen in the BBC/HBO production of Parade's End.

In 2011 he appeared at Chichester in Stoppard's Rosencrantz and Guildenstern Are Dead with fellow History Boy Samuel Barnett.  The production subsequently moved to London for a West End engagement. In the autumn of 2012 he appeared as Brick in Cat on a Hot Tin Roof at the West Yorkshire Playhouse.  In the first part of 2013 he appeared in the Menier Chocolate Factory production of Proof and in Candida at the Theatre Royal, Bath. He played the role of Mike Connor in High Society at The Old Vic in London. He also sang several numbers in the Late Night Sinatra concert given by the John Wilson Orchestra during the 2015 BBC Proms season at London's Royal Albert Hall.

In 2015 he appeared alongside his fellow History Boys co-stars in the film adaptation of Alan Bennett's The Lady in the Van.  He had a cameo as an estate agent.

He originated the role of Harry Potter in the original West End production of Harry Potter and the Cursed Child at the Palace Theatre, London. On 9 April 2017 Parker won the Laurence Olivier Award for Best Actor for his performance in the play. He reprised his performance on Broadway at the Lyric Theatre in 2018, earning a Tony Award nomination for Best Actor in a Play.

Shakespeare
In 2009 he played Oliver in As You Like It at Shakespeare's Globe.

He returned in 2010 to play Prince Hal in both Henry IV Part 1 and Henry IV Part 2. His musical talents were further exhibited (briefly) when he played a wooden recorder in an early tavern scene.

During the spring of 2012 he toured the UK in the Globe production of Henry V, a production which subsequently played at Shakespeare's Globe on London's Southbank during the summer of 2012 thereby completing his traversal of the Prince Hal story arc in Shakespeare's history plays at the Globe. Parker was also featured in two of the six episodes of the BBC Four's production Shakespeare Uncovered (2012). Each episode explored and revealed the extraordinary world and works of William Shakespeare and the still-potent impact they have today. The series combined interviews with actors, directors and scholars, along with visits to key locations, clips from some of the most celebrated film and television adaptations, and illustrative excerpts from the plays staged specially for the series at Shakespeare's Globe in London.

He played Hamlet in BBC Radio 4's production of Hamlet, directed by Marc Beeby. It was first broadcast in March 2014.

He also played Mark Anthony in BBC Radio 4's production of ‘’Julius Caesar’’, directed by Marc Beeby, first broadcast in July 2018.

Personal life
He married actress Deborah Crowe in 2007, with whom he has a son, William.

Parker's great-grandfather was the English footballer Alf Common.

Selected credits

Theatre

Radio

Television

Film

References

External links
 http://www.jamieparkeractor.com/
 
 
 BBC Four: Shakespeare Uncovered (for UK users)
 PBS: Shakespeare Uncovered (for US users)

1979 births
Living people
Actors from Middlesbrough
Alumni of RADA
English male film actors
English male radio actors
English male Shakespearean actors
English male stage actors
English male television actors
Laurence Olivier Award winners
Male actors from Yorkshire
People educated at Loretto School, Musselburgh